Minu Nariman Dastur (18 March 1916 – 5 January 2004) was an Indian mechanical and electrical engineer. His work included working with the government of India on the country's steel development plans. Dastur graduated from Banaras Hindu University with a degree in electrical & mechanical engineering in 1938 and initially worked for Tata Steel. He later moved to the United States and obtained a doctorate in metallurgy from Massachusetts Institute of Technology in 1948.

See also
 Iron and steel industry in India
 Visvesvaraya Iron and Steel Limited

References

2004 deaths
1916 births
Banaras Hindu University alumni
Indian mechanical engineers
Massachusetts Institute of Technology alumni
20th-century Indian engineers